Pool D of the First Round of the 2009 World Baseball Classic was held at Hiram Bithorn Stadium, San Juan, Puerto Rico from March 7 to 11, 2009.

Pool D was a modified double-elimination tournament. The winners for the first games matched up in the second game, while the losers faced each other in an elimination game. The winners of the elimination game then played the losers of the non-elimination game in another elimination game. The remaining two teams then played each other to determine seeding for the Pool 2.

Bracket

Results
All times are Atlantic Standard Time (UTC−04:00).

Netherlands 3, Dominican Republic 2

Puerto Rico 7, Panama 0

Dominican Republic 9, Panama 0

Puerto Rico 3, Netherlands 1

Netherlands 2, Dominican Republic 1

Puerto Rico 5, Netherlands 0

External links
Official website

Pool D
World Baseball Classic Pool D
21st century in San Juan, Puerto Rico
International baseball competitions hosted by Puerto Rico
World Baseball Classic Pool D
Sports in San Juan, Puerto Rico